Capoeta damascina, the Levantine scraper or Mesopotamian barb, is a species of cyprinid fish from the Near East region. It is reported from Iraq, Israel, Jordan, Lebanon, Syria, Iran and Turkey. 

It is said to have tasteless flesh and toxic eggs. It has been recorded hybridising with Carasobarbus canis but these hybrids are sterile.

References 

Damascina
Fish described in 1842